Bandbon-e Ujargah (also Romanized as Bandbon-e Ūjārgāh; also known as Bandbon-e Ojārgāh) is a village in Bibalan Rural District, Kelachay District, Rudsar County, Gilan Province, Iran. At the 2006 census, its population was 389, in 110 families.

References 

Populated places in Rudsar County